South Dakota Highway 13 (SD 13) is a  state highway in Moody and Brookings counties in the U.S. state of South Dakota. It connects Flandreau with Elkton. SD 13 was originally part of SD 11's path.

Route description

Moody County
SD 13 begins at an intersection with SD 34 (233rd Street) east of Egan, in the east-central part of Moody County. Here, the roadway continues to the south as 481st Avenue. This intersection is just northeast of Flandreau Municipal Airport. SD 13 travels to the north-northwest on 481st Avenue. North of 231st Street, it enters Flandreau. At Pipeston Avenue, the highway intersects the eastern terminus of SD 32. This highway leads to the business district of Flandreau. SD 13 crosses over the Big Sioux River and then leaves the city. 229th Street, just north of the city, leads to Flandreau Indian School. Here, the highway enters Flandreau Indian Reservation. Just before 228th Street is a second crossing of this river. Just north of 227th Street, the highway leaves the reservation. Between 226th and 224th Street is a crossing of Spring Creek.

Brookings County
At 220th Street, the highway enters the southeastern part of Brookings County. North of 218th Street, the highway begins to curve to the east, with 481st Avenue splitting off to the north. It intersects the eastern terminus of SD 324. At about the 484th Avenue intersection, SD 13 curves to the east-northeast. It then begins to skirt along the northwestern edge of Elkton. Between 485th Avenue and North Drive, the highway crosses over some railroad tracks of Union Pacific Railroad. It then curves to the north, onto 486th Avenue. Just north of 216th Street is a crossing of Medary Creek. Just south of 215th Street, the highway begins a curve to the north-northeast. It then reaches its northern terminus, an intersection with U.S. Route 14 (US 14).

History

SD 13 was formerly a segment of SD 11. This was changed to SD 13 between 1932 and 1935. At that time, its original northern terminus was extended eastward to its current location at US 14 north of Elkton. This was due to a rerouting of US 14 in the early 1930s.

Major intersections

See also

 List of state highways in South Dakota

References

External links

 The Unofficial South Dakota Highways Page: Highways 1-30

0013
Transportation in Moody County, South Dakota
Transportation in Brookings County, South Dakota